Palinstrophy is the curl of the vorticity. It is defined as

where  is the vorticity.

Palinstrophy is mainly used in turbulence study, where there is a need to quantify how vorticity is transferred from one direction to the others. It is closely related to enstrophy, the latter being more equivalent to the "power" of vorticity.

References

Lesieur, Marcel. "Turbulence in fluids: stochastic and numerical modeling." NASA STI/Recon Technical Report A 91 (1990): 24106.
Pouquet, A., et al. "Evolution of high Reynolds number two-dimensional turbulence." Journal of Fluid Mechanics 72 (1975): 305-319.

Fluid dynamics